The two plovercrests comprise the genus Stephanoxis. They were formerly considered conspecific under the name "black-breasted plovercrest".

Species
The SACC accepted both as distinct species in 2015.  The two species are:

References

 

Stephanoxis